Taha Akyol is a Turkish journalist and writer of Abkhazian descent. Akyol worked as a journalist at the Yankı news magazine, and the Tercüman, Meydan and Milliyet dailies. After the 1980s, he distanced himself from Turkish nationalism, turning toward conservative liberalism. While being a true classical liberal, both in political and economic terms, he takes a rightist-conservative approach to culture and foreign policy. Akyol is a member of the Board of Trustees at TOBB University of Economics and Technology. He is a producer at CNN Türk and was a columnist for the Hürriyet daily until its new, Erdogan-allied owners fired him in September 2018.

Akyol is married and a father of two. He is the father of Turkish journalist and writer Mustafa Akyol.

Bibliography
 Atatürk'ün İhtilal Hukuku / 2012
 Demokrasiden Darbeye Babam Adnan Menderes / 2011
 Ortak Acı 1915 Türkler ve Ermeniler / 2009
 Ama Hangi Atatürk / Ocak 2008 / 3. baskı Mart 2008
 Medine'den Lozan'a / Kasım 2004
 Kitaplar Arasında / Haziran 2002 / 2. baskı Aralık 2005
 Hariciler ve Hizbullah, İslam Toplumlarında Terörün Kökleri / Mart 2000 / 3. baskı Nisan 2000
 Mezhep ve Devlet, Osmanlı'da ve İran'da / Ocak 1999 / 7. baskı Kasım 2006
 Hayat Yolunda, Gençler İçin Anılar ve Öneriler / Kasım 1997 / 8. baskı Ekim 2007
 Bilim ve Yanılgı / 1997 / 5. baskı Aralık 2005
 1980'lerde Türkiye
 Azerbaycan, Sovyetler ve Ötesi
 Bilim ve Yanılgı
 Haricîlik ve Şia
 Hayat Yolunda
 Lenin'siz Komünizm
 Politikada Şiddet
 Sovyet Rus Stratejisi ve Türkiye (2 cilt)
 Tarihten Geleceğe
 Osmanlı Mirasından Cumhuriyet Türkiyesi'ne

References

External links 
 His works published in Hurriyet

Living people
Journalists from Istanbul
Turkish people of Abkhazian descent
Istanbul University Faculty of Law alumni
Year of birth missing (living people)